Trevon Travis Salazar (born February 28, 1991) is a Belizean racing cyclist, who once competed for his native country at the Vuelta a Guatemala in the junior class in 2009. He currently rides for cycling team, Bahati Foundation Elite Team. In 2009 he won the Jr SanCas/BTB City Classic, a criterium race traversing albert and regent streets from house of culture to Belize Bank.

Career

2009
2nd in KREM New Years' Day Cycling Classic (BIZ)
6th in  National Championships, Road, Junior, Belize (BIZ)
1st in stage 2  junior Tour of Belize(BIZ)

References
sports-reference

1991 births
Living people
Belizean male cyclists